Teppei Tomioka (冨岡鉄平 Tomioka Teppei, born March 1, 1977) is the captain of the Toshiba Brave Lupus rugby team. He plays at centre. Originally from Fukuoka Prefecture, he was educated at Fukuoka Institute of Technology (Fukuoka Kougyou Daigaku). He is considered to be a powerful runner and leader of his team. He was voted the MVP of the Top League in 2007.

External source
  Tomioka grabs MVP award, Daily Yomiuri, February 7, 2007

1977 births
Living people
Japanese rugby union players
Toshiba Brave Lupus Tokyo players
Sportspeople from Fukuoka Prefecture
Japan international rugby union players
Fukuoka Institute of Technology alumni
Rugby union centres